Blue Hill Avenue may refer to:

 Blue Hill Avenue, a major street in Roxbury and Dorchester
 Massachusetts Route 28, its northern part
 Massachusetts Route 138, its southern part
 Blue Hill Avenue station, a station located on said avenue
 Blue Hill Avenue (film), a 2001 film named for said avenue